The following is a list of characters that appear in the light novel series KonoSuba by Natsume Akatsuki and its various spin-offs.

Kazuma's party

Kazuma Satō

.      
Kazuma is the main protagonist of Kono Subarashii Sekai ni Shukufuku wo!, a 17-year-old game-obsessed shut-in, becoming one after having his heart broken by his childhood friend in middle school. While returning home from buying a video game, he attempts to save a classmate from being hit by a slow-moving tractor he mistakes for a speeding truck, and dies from acute stress reaction. As a result, he is sent to a parallel reality and becomes a role-playing game character. He has average stats in crucial categories, but above average intelligence and extremely high luck, neither of which are important for adventurers.  Regardless, he becomes one and learns basic skills such as steal, archery, monster detection, and basic magic. Because he never chooses a class, Kazuma is referred to as an "Adventurer" and is able to learn foundational abilities and spells that would otherwise be exclusive to a single class, and learns to overcome the limitations of his classless status by combining skills and spells in unexpected ways. Kazuma lusts on almost all the females he sees, except Aqua, who even when he acknowledges her as attractive can't seem to get excited by her, even when trying. He is initially seen as just perverted and hopeless by his female companions, but as time passes he proves to be reliable and useful when the situation calls for it, that along with other good traits he has leads to Megumin and Darkness eventually falling in love with him. Kazuma finds Darkness extremely attractive but her personality turns him off, and while seeing Megumin only as a child at the start of the series, as time passes he starts to find her attractive as well, eventually falling in love with her and accepting her confession, entering a state of "more than friends, less than lovers". Kazuma rejects Darkness when she confesses to him, but that hasn't stopped her from trying to seduce him, even stealing his first kiss and forcing herself onto him to win over his affection. Eventually, Megumin and Kazuma shared a passionate french kiss while trying to have intercourse, before the battle against the Devil King, but a running gag in the later volumes of the light novel is that every time they are about to get intimate they get interrupted. Megumin promised Kazuma to give him "something incredible", once they returned home after defeating the Devil King.

Aqua

Aqua is the goddess of water who judges humans to send to the RPG world up until Kazuma drags her along with him after she provokes him by mocking his death. She is an energetic and inattentive girl who likes to receive reverence for her status, particularly from her Axis cult, and is a total crybaby and gets upset easily. As an archpriest and a goddess, she is powerful against demons and the undead and is able to resurrect recently deceased people as well as purify water supplies. However, despite her high stats in magic, her intelligence and luck are among the worst. Additionally, rather than learning skills that would benefit her party, she spends most of her skill points learning party tricks.

Megumin

Megumin is the main protagonist of Kono Subarashii Sekai ni Bakuen wo!, a 14 year-old  archwizard who is part of the Crimson Demons race – modified humans who possess dark brown hair, crimson eyes, powerful magic affinity, and chūnibyō characteristics. with an eye patch for aesthetic reasons. Megumin only knows a single, incredibly powerful Explosion spell that immediately depletes her mana and incapacitates her after a single use, and refuses to learn any other skills. Due to the strength and resulting fallout of the spell, she struggles to find a party who would accept her prior to meeting Kazuma. In the process, she eventually falls in love with Kazuma. She confesses her feelings to him, leading them to become a couple, but their secret is exposed when Darkness confesses her love to him as well. She was called an explosion maniac by Kazuma.

Darkness

Darkness is an 18-year-old crusader who possesses powerful offense and defense but lacks the accuracy to deliver her attacks. She is a masochist who dreams of being ravaged by monsters or married to an abusive husband. She becomes serious when issues involve her friends. She, like Megumin, eventually falls in love with Kazuma, and she tries to seduce him, but Megumin stops her after she returns from her village. She was once referenced as a bouncy and busty beauty by Kazuma but despaired at her personalities' contents.

Devil King's generals

Devil King
The  is the main antagonist of the story, who aspires to destroy the humans. In a legend, he is described as being a talented, yet isolated, youth who defeated the previous Devil King and assumed his role. He has eight generals to serve him, all of whom must be defeated before one would attack his castle.

Verdia

Verdia is a dullahan and former knight. He becomes hostile towards Kazuma's party after Megumin keeps using his castle for Explosion practice. He is weak against water and is defeated by Aqua's purifying magic. Though he had a sense of honor from his knighthood days, he also had a tendency to roll his head underneath Wiz's skirt as she walked by.

Vanir

Vanir was one of the Devil King's generals who ends up taking over the management of Wiz's magic shop. He is the devil of foresight and one of the dukes of hell, with the ability to read everything about anybody, but he cannot read anything about people that are as powerful as he is (the Devil King's generals and other dukes), people stronger than him (Aqua and other gods), and people who are a little weaker than him; these people have their readings clouded and incomplete. An exception to this is Kazuma, whose cunning nature makes him hard to read. He also has very powerful combat skills that he refuses to use on humans.
Planning to resign from his position as a boss, Vanir discovers a previously-cleared dungeon which he turns into his hideout, hoping to achieve his dream of tricking those who defeat him in battle into thinking there were riches inside a treasure chest, only to discover a piece of paper mocking them. He is subsequently defeated by Megumin's Explosion spell and forms a second body to live in, moving to Axel and starts working at Wiz's shop. He holds a grudge against Aqua, who frequently attempts to purify him.

Hans

Hans is a deadly poison slime variant type with the ability to devour anything, taking the form of those he devoured and a strong body filled with poison, which he uses in a foiled mission to contaminate the hot springs of the city of Alcanretia.

Sylvia

Sylvia is a growth chimera with the ability to modify his own body. He takes the form and voice of a woman, retaining his male genitalia. He attacks the home of the Crimson Demons, whom he despises due to their frequent usage of magic.

Wolbach

The evil goddess of violence and sloth, Wolbach is worshiped by the Devil King's subordinates. She uses her vast reserves of mana to cast Explosion magic on the Belzerg fort at the frontlines, then to teleport to safety. She was split into two entities, one of them humanoid, and the other is Chomusuke, Megumin's cat. In the Explosions spin-off series, it is revealed 
.

Supporting characters

Wiz

Wiz is a powerful lich wizard and formerly one of the Devil King's generals. She was tasked with maintaining the barrier surrounding the King's castle, though she eventually leaves her position under a neutrality agreement which prohibits her from interfering with the King's army as long as non-combatants are not targeted by his forces. She is a timid and kind woman who uses her powers to assist civilians and lead lost spirits to the afterlife. She runs an unsuccessful magic shop in Axel which is later managed by Vanir, in which she is treated like a slave worker.

Yunyun

Yunyun is Megumin's former classmate and daughter to the Crimson Demons' chief. She has a normal personality, causing her to be ironically estranged from her chūnibyō peers. Yunyun is a highly skilled archwizard and forms a rivalry with Megumin as an excuse to create a friendship.

Kyoya Mitsurugi

Kyoya is another human who was sent to this world by Aqua. Due to his stereotype behavior he has a misguided perception that he is the idealistic hero and thinks Aqua is a dignified goddess, which annoys Kazuma's party. Kyoya was given a cursed sword known as Gram as his chosen item upon entry, but simply loses it in a duel to Kazuma, who uses his Steal skill to swipe it. Kazuma later pawns it off for extra money. Kyoya parties with two girls, spear and dagger users, by his side. When word of the Chivalrous Thief's burglaries spreads, Kyoya is summoned to the capital to serve as a guard.

Luna

 Luna is a receptionist in the Axel guild. She works at the guild's counter, assisting adventurers in registering and providing quests. Despite her attractive appearance and large bust, she does not have any romantic endeavors due to her consuming work, much to her chagrin.

Ruffian

A recurring anime-exclusive character who resides in Axel and appears during important plot points. It is later revealed he is merely an artisan weaver.

Chris

Chris is Darkness' friend and a thief who teaches Kazuma the Steal skill. She is Eris' alternate persona; in contrast with her docile nature as Eris, Chris has a more energetic personality. In the sixth volume, she targets the houses of nobility to steal holy relics, and is dubbed the Chivalrous Thief.

Eris

Eris is a goddess of the RPG world whom Kazuma first meets after he is killed during a battle. She is kindhearted but is prone to embarrassment from Aqua, who is jealous over how much more Eris is worshiped despite being Aqua's junior goddess. It is later revealed Chris is her persona in this world. She wears padding in her bra.

Dust

Dust is the local delinquent in Axel and a friend of Kazuma, often getting drunk in the guild's tavern or arrested for petty crimes. A former Dragon Knight, he fights with his sword and travels with a party of three: Taylor, a sword user, Rin, a wizard, and Keith, an archer. In the second volume, Dust and Kazuma switch parties for a day; while Kazuma and Dust's party successfully complete their quests, Dust's nearly ends in disaster while Kazuma's goes swimmingly thanks to Dust's far more competent party.

Kingdom of Belzerg
Much of KonoSuba story takes place in the Kingdom of Belzerg, particularly in the city of Axel, where most rookie adventurers are located. One of Axel's landmarks is its guild, where adventurers can register for jobs and take quests. Also located in Belzerg is the city of Alcanretia, one known for its hot springs and civilian population devoted to the Axis cult.

Sena

Sena is the special prosecutor of the Kingdom of Belzerg in charge of serious crimes, such as treason and conspiring with the Devil King. She was sent to arrest and investigate Kazuma when the teleported Destroyer core blew up Alderp's mansion. Despite Kazuma's innocence, she remains suspicious of his activities and summons him to solve various situations, including the confrontation with Vanir.

Alderp Alexei Barnes

The Lord of Axel, whose mansion was destroyed by Kazuma's decision to randomly teleport the Destroyer's core. As punishment, he attempts to manipulate the trial to sentence Kazuma to death, but fails upon Darkness' intervention. His estate is later under the scrutiny of Kazuma's party after a wave of robberies plagues the nation's nobility.

Walther Alexei Barnes

Alderp's son, a kind, courteous, and noble-minded knight of the realm, who was to wed Darkness as arranged by his father (much to Darkness' distaste). When Darkness invents the story that she cannot marry him as she is carrying Kazuma's child, he decides to tell his father that he has declined the match.

Ignis Dustiness Ford

A prominent noble and Darkness' father. He disapproves of his daughter's adventuring lifestyle and attempts to arrange marriages for her, though to little success. After Alderp's disappearance, Ignis becomes the next Lord of Axel.

Iris Belzerg Stylish Sword
 / 
Iris is the 12 year old princess of Belzerg. Curious about adventure stories, she develops a close relationship with Kazuma, whom she treats like her older brother, and has a brother complex. Despite her age, she is proficient with swords and carries a divine blade called Calibur.

Crimson Demons
In the KonoSuba: An Explosion on This Wonderful World light novel spin-off series, the Crimson Demon race are the main focus of the series.

Komekko

Arue

Funifura

Dodonko

Nerimaki

Chomusuke

Pucchin

References

KonoSuba
KonoSuba